Apgujeongrodeo is a station on the Suin-Bundang Line, a commuter rail line of Korail.

From 2 May to 31 July 2013, the station hosted the 2PM G+Star Zone exhibition, featuring boyband 2PM, as part of the G+Dream Project by Gangnam-gu Office for disadvantaged youth.

Vicinity
Galleria Department Store Luxury hall has a direct underground link with the station. The 760-meter-long section of main street Apgujeong-ro, that runs from this station at Galleria Department Store to Cheongdam crossroad, has been dubbed the 'Cheongdam Fashion Street' or 'Cheongdamdong Street of Luxury Goods'. It is lined with stores of luxury brands, such as Ermenegildo Zegna, Salvatore Ferragamo, Louis Vuitton, Prada, Burberry, as well as outlets for 3.1 Phillip Lim, Martin Margiela and Tory Burch and Korean designer Son Jung-wan.

References

Seoul Metropolitan Subway stations
Metro stations in Gangnam District
Railway stations opened in 2012